The Palace of the Council of the Nation is the home of the Council of the Nation, the upper house of the Algerian Parliament, in Algiers, Algeria.

History

The building has been the home of the Council of the Nation since its establishment in 1997, after decades of unicameralism following the Algerian War and the country's independence in 1962.

In the 2010s, plans were considered to relocate the Council of the Nation and the People's National Assembly in a new Algerian Parliament complex, to be built northeast of Les Fusillés Station in the waterfront neighborhood of Hussein Dey.

See also
 People's National Assembly building (Algiers)
 Government Palace (Algiers)
 People's Palace (Algiers)
 El Mouradia Palace

Notes

Legislative buildings
Government buildings in Algeria
Buildings and structures in Algiers